Mississippi Highway 63 (MS 63) is a state highway in southeastern Mississippi that runs north–south for approximately . It serves Jackson County, George County, Greene County, and Wayne County.

Route description

MS 63 begins in Jackson County in Pascagoula at an interchange with US 90, with the road continuing south into an industrial park as MS 611. It heads north as a four-lane divided highway to immediately leave Pascagoula and enter neighboring Moss Point, where it passes through some neighborhoods to have an intersection with Grierson Street (unsigned MS 618) and cross over the Escatawpa River. The highway travels through a business district before having an interchange with I-10 (Exit 69) and passing by the Trent Lott International Airport. MS 63 now leaves Moss Point and heads north through rural areas, parallel to the Pascagoula River, for the next several miles, passing through the communities of Escatawpa (where it has an intersection with MS 613 and passes by Plant Daniel) and Wade (where it has an intersection with MS 614) before crossing into George County.

MS 63 continues north through rural farmland  for several miles to have an intersection with Old Highway 63 before following an expressway grade bypass of the town of Lucedale, passing through the western side of town as it has an interchange with MS 26, crosses over MS 198 without an interchange or connection of any kind, and an interchange with US 98. It now leaves the Lucedale area and travels through woodlands for a couple miles to cross into Greene County.

MS 63 continues through woodlands for the next several miles (part of the Kurtz State Forest) to an interchange between MS 57 and MS 594 (Old Highway 63), with the expressway continuing north along MS 57, and MS 63 becomes concurrent (overlapped) with MS 57 southbound and they head northwest as a two-lane highway to have an intersection with Old Highway 57 before crossing the Chickasawhay River into the town of Leakesville. MS 57/MS 63 travel straight through downtown along Main Street (passing by the Greene County Courthouse) before the two highways split on the western side of town, with MS 63 heading northwest to pass by the South Mississippi Correctional Institution before cutting in-and-out of the De Soto National Forest for the next several miles. The highway travels through the community of Sand Hill, where it has an intersection and short concurrency with MS 42, before crossing into Wayne County.

MS 63 now travels through a large tract of the National Forest, where it has an intersection with Strickland Road (unsigned MS 536), before leaving the National Forest permanently and winding its way northeast through the community of Clara before crossing the Chickasawhay River for a second time to enter the city of Waynesboro. The highway passes through neighborhoods along Turner Street before entering downtown and coming to an end at an intersection with MS 184 (Azalea Drive).

History

Mississippi Highway 63 provides part of a four-lane corridor connecting Moss Point and the Gulf Coast with US 45 north to Meridian.

MS 63 bypasses Lucedale to the west along a controlled access expressway completed in November 2000. Six miles of the former alignment of MS 63 and two miles of MS 26 were turned over to George County and Lucedale city maintenance once the bypass opened. MS 63 previously ran along Winter and Main Streets, including overlaps with both MS 26 and US 98/MS 198. Until August 22, 2011, the four lane section of MS 63 ended at a diamond interchange with US 98 to the northwest of Lucedale. Opening at that time was the continuation of the four lane corridor north to MS 57 and MS 594 near Leakesville. MS 57 runs along the northernmost extent of the corridor to US 45 at State Line.

Construction on the 25 mile long section of four-lane roadway for MS 63 and MS 57 in George and Greene Counties commenced in 2008 with the awarding of a $42.1 million contract to Tanner Construction of Ellisville. The four lane alignment of MS 57/63 was incorporated into the four lane corridor extending north along US 45 to Corinth and the Tennessee state line. The 110-mile corridor through the Southern District of the Mississippi Department of Transportation (MDOT) cost $325 million overall. Initial work built the new roadway northward from the Jackson County line in 1992.

Work started on the interchange joining the south end of MS 63 with MS 611 and US 90 in December 2010. Funded by a $35 million Mississippi Development Authority grant, the $21 million first phase made improvements along MS 63 and MS 611, including the 711 foot long overpass spanning US 90 and the adjacent CSX Railroad. Costing $13.6 million, the second phase widening MS 611 to five lanes from Old Mobile Highway to the Chevron refinery in Pascagoula, commenced in March 2014.

Historically, the alignment of MS 613 was the previous route for MS 63. MS 63 was realigned westward from Big Point, Hurley and Agricola in 1960, with MS 613 designated northward from their meeting outside Moss Point to US 98 in Lucedale. With a new alignment built for MS 63 south into Moss Point, MS 613 was extended south over the former MS 63 to Pascagoula by 1981.

Major intersections

References

External links

Magnolia Meanderings

063
Transportation in Jackson County, Mississippi
Transportation in George County, Mississippi
Transportation in Greene County, Mississippi
Transportation in Wayne County, Mississippi